Richard O'Shaughnessy  (1842 – 17 August 1918) was an Irish Home Rule League politician.

He was elected Home Rule MP for Limerick City in 1874 and held the seat until he was appointed a registrar of petty sessions clerks in 1883.

After leaving office, he was also Commissioner for Public Works in Ireland from 1891 to 1903, and was considered for the post of Under-Secretary for Ireland twice.

He became a Member of the Royal Victorian Order in 1900 and a Companion of the Order of the Bath in 1903.

References

External links
 
 
 

UK MPs 1874–1880
UK MPs 1880–1885
1842 births
1918 deaths
Home Rule League MPs
Members of the Parliament of the United Kingdom for County Limerick constituencies (1801–1922)